This is a list of electoral results for the electoral district of Ipswich East in Queensland state elections.

Members for Ipswich East

Election results

Elections in the 1960s

References

Queensland state electoral results by district